The Best of the Grateful Dead is an album by the rock band the Grateful Dead.  It is a two-CD compilation of songs recorded in the studio from throughout their career.  It includes at least one track from each of their studio albums, recorded from 1967 to 1989 and arranged in chronological order.  It was released by Rhino Records on March 31, 2015.

The Best of the Grateful Dead includes songs from all the studio albums in the band's discography, along with one non-album single "Dark Star" (recorded in 1968 as part of the Anthem of the Sun studio sessions).

Critical reception

On AllMusic, Stephen Thomas Erlewine wrote, "[The album] follows a strict chronological sequence, so it takes a little while for the psychedelic haze to lift and the Dead to settle into the rangy, rootsy groove that characterized so much of their existence... From there, many—but by no means all—of the group's warhorses are marched out, all in their studio incarnations.... By celebrating the warts and providing space for that unexpected late–'80s commercial comeback, The Best of the Grateful Dead is a good capsule history of a band that usually defies such straightforward narratives."

Track listing

Personnel
Jerry Garcia – guitar, vocals
Bob Weir – guitar, vocals
Phil Lesh – bass, vocals
Bill Kreutzmann – drums, percussion
Mickey Hart – drums, percussion
Ron "Pigpen" McKernan – organ, harmonica, percussion, vocals
Tom Constanten – keyboards
Keith Godchaux – keyboards
Donna Jean Godchaux – vocals
Brent Mydland – keyboards, vocals

References

Grateful Dead compilation albums
Rhino Entertainment compilation albums
2015 greatest hits albums